William Dee Reynolds (August 14, 1884 – June 5, 1924) was a catcher in Major League Baseball for the New York Yankees from 1913 to 1914.  He was later a manager in the minor leagues for the Waco Indians of the Texas Association in 1923.

External links

1884 births
1924 deaths
Major League Baseball catchers
Baseball players from Texas
New York Yankees players
Minor league baseball managers
Houston Buffaloes players
Dallas Giants players
Jersey City Skeeters players
Newark Indians players
Harrisburg Senators players
Richmond Climbers players
Richmond Virginians (minor league) players
People from Eastland, Texas